Margit Anna Kristina Bergstrand (born 4 October 1963) is an ice hockey player from Sweden. She won a bronze medal at the 2002 Winter Olympics.

References 

1963 births
Living people
Ice hockey players at the 2002 Winter Olympics
Olympic ice hockey players of Sweden
Swedish women's ice hockey forwards
Olympic medalists in ice hockey
Olympic bronze medalists for Sweden
Medalists at the 2002 Winter Olympics
Ice hockey players at the 1998 Winter Olympics
Ice hockey people from Stockholm